Rosa setigera, commonly known as the climbing rose, the prairie rose, or the climbing wild rose, is a shrub or vine in the Rosaceae (rose) family native to central and eastern North America.

Description
The plant grows either as a vine or forms a sprawling thicket. In areas with vegetation or other structures, the stems will tend to climb. The stems are green or brown with a reddish tint and have curved prickles.

The leaves are alternate and compound, with 3 to 5 leaflets on each leaf. Leaflets are ovate, with serrate or doubly serrate margins.

The fragrant flowers, blooming May to July, are usually pink, occasionally white, and appear either singly or in groups, or panicles on stalks. The fruit appears later in the summer as bright red rose hips.

Distribution and habitat
R. setigera is native in the United States from Texas and Nebraska in the west, Wisconsin in the north, New Hampshire in the east, and Florida in the south. It is also native to Ontario and is listed as a species of special concern because of loss of habitat. The plant can be found in areas with average to moist, well-drained soils, including forests and woodlands, roadsides, bluffs, streambanks, old fields, and pastures.

Ecology
The flowers bloom in the spring to summer, with rose hips following later in the summer. Bees pollinate the flowers, and various other insects feed on the plant. Birds and mammals eat the hips. R. setigera is the larval host for several species of moths, including Paleacrita vernata (spring cankerworm), Stigmella rosaefoliella, and Coptotriche roseticola.

References

setigera
Flora of the Eastern United States
Flora of Canada